Katarína Dubajová (born 9 December 1978) is a Slovak handball player. She recently played for MKS Olimpia/Beskid Nowy Sącz and the Slovak national team, but is now retired.

References

1978 births
Living people
Slovak female handball players